This article lists the administrators of former South African provinces. It includes officials who headed various provinces in the period from 1910 to 1994, when South Africa was administratively divided into four provinces:
Province of the Cape of Good Hope, with its seat in Cape Town
Province of Natal (Natalprovinsie), with its seat in Pietermaritzburg
Province of the Orange Free State (Provinsie Oranje-Vrystaat), with its seat in Bloemfontein
Province of the Transvaal (Provinsie van Transvaal), with its seat in Pretoria

The provinces were created in 1910 as successors of four previous British colonies in the same territory: Cape Colony (1806–1910), Colony of Natal (1843–1910), Orange River Colony (1902–10) and Transvaal Colony (1902–10). These four provinces were established as a result of the creation of the Union of South Africa in 1910. They survived the subsequent creation of the Republic of South Africa in 1961, and were abolished in 1994, in the wake of the first post-apartheid general election in April 1994.

Cape Province

Natal Province

Orange Free State Province

Transvaal Province

See also
Administrative divisions of South Africa
Provinces of South Africa
Premier (South Africa), lists current premier in each of the 9 provinces

References

"Provinces of South Africa: Provinces 1910–1994: Administrators" ... by province, worldstatesmen.org © Ben Cahoon.

External links
World Statesmen – South Africa (Provinces)

South Africa history-related lists
Lists of provinces of South Africa
Provincial governments of South Africa